The Philippines national basketball team was led by head coach Chot Reyes in the early part of 2022 until the appointment of Nenad Vucinic in June.

The Samahang Basketbol ng Pilipinas announced Reyes' appointment as head coach of the team on January 31 following Tab Baldwin's departure shortly prior to the February 2022 window of the 2023 FIBA Basketball World Cup qualifiers. Baldwin's departure was unexpected with Reyes tasked to prepare the team on short notice.

Reyes was able to lead the team to a win against India but lost a game to New Zealand. South Korea who were part of the same group had to withdraw after it forfeited two games due to some of its players testing positive for COVID-19 pursuant to COVID-19 pandemic-related protocols.

The Philippines took part in the 2021 Southeast Asian Games in Vietnam which was postponed by a year due to the pandemic. The team settled for silver, with Indonesia winning the gold medal. The result was considered an upset; the only other time the Philippines did not win the title was in the 1989 edition.

In June, Nenad Vucinic who has been Reyes' assistant coach was designated as head coach of the Philippines for the June-July 2022 window of the World Cup qualifiers.

Reyes would return as the team's head coach for the 2022 FIBA Asia Cup.

Tournaments

2023 FIBA Basketball World Cup qualification (Asia)

2021 Southeast Asian Games

2022 FIBA Asia Cup

Exhibition games

Rosters

References

Philippines men's national basketball team results
2021–22 in Philippine basketball